This was a new event on the 2013 ITF Women's Circuit.

Oksana Kalashnikova and Aleksandra Krunić won the title, defeating Ani Amiraghyan and Dalila Jakupović in the final, 6–2, 6–1.

Seeds

Draw

External links 
 Draw

Trabzon Cup (2) - Doubles
Trabzon Cup